Hong Thai Travel Services was one of the largest travel agencies in Hong Kong. It was founded in 1966 and at its peak had employees in more than 30 sales offices, located in Hong Kong, Macao, China (Guangdong Province), United States, Canada, Thailand and Taiwan. Since 2002, the company has operated out of its headquarters in 95 Queensway, Hong Kong Island, Hong Kong.

History
Hong Thai Travel Services was founded in Hong Kong by Jackie Wong See Sum in 1966. Its primary business was booking of airline tickets, ferry tickets and offering services for inbound tourism. Its director is Jackie Wong See Sum (黃士心) and its general manager is Jason Wong Chun Tat (黃進達).

Incident

On August 23, 2010, a twelve-hour-long hostage incident on one of the company's buses in Manila, Philippines, occurred. Twenty-five people, part of a tour group from Hong Kong, were taken hostage on a bus by the gunman, Rolando Mendoza, a former police officer. Eight of them were killed, seven injured while six left the scene unharmed. Mendoza was killed by the police with a bullet to his head in the end.

References

External links 
Official website

Tourism in Hong Kong
Travel and holiday companies of China
Service companies of Hong Kong
Travel agencies
Transport companies established in 1966
1966 establishments in Hong Kong
Hong Kong brands